Rouvroy may refer to:

Places
 Rouvroy, Belgium, a municipality in Wallonia, Belgium
 Rouvroy, Aisne, a commune in the Aisne département in France
 Rouvroy, Pas-de-Calais, a commune in the Pas-de-Calais département in France

House of Rouvroy 

 Louis de Rouvroy, duc de Saint-Simon
 Claude Henri de Rouvroy, comte de Saint-Simon, a French utopian socialist thinker.
 Claude de Rouvroy, duc de Saint-Simon
 Claude - Charles de Rouvroy
 Charles François de Rouvroy